The Ambassador Extraordinary and Plenipotentiary of the Russian Federation to Canada is the official representative of the President and the Government of the Russian Federation to the Prime Minister and the Government of Canada.

The ambassador and his staff work at large in the Embassy of Russia in Ottawa. There are Consulate Generals in Montreal and Vancouver, and honorary consuls in Edmonton, St. John's, Windsor and Vancouver.

History of diplomatic relations

Prior to 1917, the Russian Empire maintained consular services in the Dominion of Canada, then part of the British Empire. By the time of the fall of the Tsarist government in 1917, there were consulates in Montreal, Halifax, and Vancouver. These did not recognise, and were not accredited by, the Soviet state, but continued to function until the late 1920s, funded by the Canadian government to deal with the large number of White émigrés who began to settle in the country.

Diplomatic relations at the mission level between the Soviet Union and Canada were first established on 12 June 1942. This was during the Second World War, when Canada and the Soviet Union were part of the allies. The first envoy, Fedor Tarasovich Gusev, was appointed on 30 July 1942, and presented his credentials on 21 October that year. Gusev left the post on 12 August 1943, and in November that year the missions were upgraded to embassies. Relations cooled significantly after the war, with the Gouzenko Affair and subsequent Kellock–Taschereau Commission in 1946 resulting in increasingly hostile communications.  Both sides withdrew their ambassadors that year, and representation was thereafter by charge d'affaires following until 1953. With the dissolution of the Soviet Union in 1991, the Soviet ambassador, continued as representative of the Russian Federation until 1992.

List of representatives (1942 – present)

Representatives of the Soviet Union to Canada (1942 – 1991)

Representatives of the Russian Federation to Canada (1991 – present)

References

External links

 
Canada
Russia